was a professional Go player.

Biography 
Hashimoto turned pro in 1947 when he was just 12. It took him only 11 years to reach 9p. He learned Go from his father Hashimoto Kunisaburō and his disciples include Takahara Shūji, Moriyama Naoki, Oda Hiromitsu, Okahashi Hirotada, and Hayashi Kōzō. He was a member of the Kansai Ki-in.

Titles & runners-up

References

1935 births
Japanese Go players
2009 deaths